The 2003 Philadelphia mayoral election was a contest between Democratic incumbent John F. Street and Republican businessman Sam Katz.

Pennsylvania Governor and former Mayor of Philadelphia Ed Rendell played a key role for Street by ensuring that business interests did not support Katz.

The race was covered in the documentary film The Shame of a City. This was the last election prior to the 2019 election that saw a Republican nominee carry a ward, with Katz carrying several.

Democratic primary

Candidates

Declared
 John F. Street, incumbent Mayor

Results

Mayor John Street was unopposed for renomination by the Democratic Party.

Republican primary

Candidates

Declared
 Sam Katz, candidate for Mayor in 1991 and 1999

Results

Sam Katz was unopposed for the Republican nomination.

General election

Polling

Results

External links
Election results from the Committee of Seventy

Notes

References

2003 in Philadelphia
2003
2003 Pennsylvania elections
Philadelphia